Agrarian reform can refer either, narrowly, to government-initiated or government-backed redistribution of agricultural land (see land reform) or, broadly, to an overall redirection of the agrarian system of the country, which often includes land reform measures. Agrarian reform can include credit measures, training, extension, land consolidations, etc. The World Bank evaluates agrarian reform using five dimensions: (1) stocks and market liberalization, (2) land reform (including the development of land markets), (3) agro-processing and input supply channels, (4) urban finance, (5) market institutions.

The United Nations thesaurus sees agrarian reform as a component of agricultural economics and policy, with a specific impact on rural sociology, and broader than land reform, describing agrarian reform as:Reforms covering all aspects of agrarian institutions, including land reform, production and supporting services structure, public administration in rural areas, rural social welfare and educational institutions, etc.Cousins defines the difference between agrarian reform and land reform as follows:
Land reform… is concerned with rights in land, and their character, strength and distribution, while… [agrarian reform] focuses not only on these but also a broader set of issues: the class character of the relations of production and distribution in farming and related enterprises, and how these connect to the wider class structure. It is thus concerned economic and political power and the relations between them…Along similar lines, a 2003 World Bank report states,…A key precondition for land reform to be feasible and effective in improving beneficiaries' livelihoods is that such programs fit into a broader policy aimed at reducing poverty and establishing a favourable environment for the development of productive smallholder agriculture by beneficiaries.

Examples of other issues include "tenure security" for "farm workers, labour tenants, … farm dwellers… [and] tenant peasants", which makes these workers and tenants better prospects for receiving private-sector loans;
"infrastructure and support services";
government support of "forms of rural enterprise" that are "complementary" to agriculture;
and increased community participation of government decisions in rural areas.

See also
Agrarian law
Agribusiness
Committee on Sustainability Assessment (COSA)
Food security
Food sovereignty
Land reform
Land reforms by country
Tiberius Gracchus

References

External links
Global Food Security Threatened by Corporate Land Grabs in Poor Countries - video report by Democracy Now!
Springer, S. 2012.  "Illegal evictions? Overwriting possession and orality with law’s violence in Cambodia."] Journal of Agrarian Change, vol, 13, no. 4, pp. 520–546, https://doi.org/10.1111/j.1471-0366.2012.00368.x

Agrarian politics
Land reform

pt:Reforma agrária